Altagonum cracens is a species of ground beetle in the subfamily Carabinae. It was described by Darlington in 1971.

References

cracens
Beetles described in 1971